Belgium competed at the 2018 Winter Paralympics in PyeongChang, South Korea, held from 9 to 18 March 2018.

Administration

Olek Kazimirowski served as Chef de Mission.

Medalists

Team members
Two Belgian athletes are selected for the 2018 Games.

Alpine skiing
Men

Jasper Balcaen (classification: LW9-1; already competed at the 2014 Winter Paralympics)

Women

 Eléonor Sana (classification: B2; debut; guided by her sister Chloé Sana)

See also
 Belgium at the 2018 Winter Olympics

References

Nations at the 2018 Winter Paralympics
2018
Paralympics